Eva Nováková (born 18 January 1938) is a Czech politician. Having served in the Federal Assembly of Czechoslovakia, she went on to serve in the Chamber of Deputies of the Parliament of the Czech Republic before representing Kroměříž as a senator from 1996 to 1998.

References 

1938 births
Living people
People from Martin, Slovakia
Movement for Autonomous Democracy–Party for Moravia and Silesia politicians
KDU-ČSL MPs
Members of the Chamber of the People of Czechoslovakia (1990–1992)
Members of the Chamber of Deputies of the Czech Republic (1992–1996)
Members of the Senate of the Czech Republic
20th-century Czech women politicians
Czechoslovak physicians
Czech women physicians
21st-century Czech women politicians